Sergey Bidonko (born August 18, 1975, Karpinsk, Sverdlovsk Oblast) is a Russian political figure, deputy of the 7th and 8th State Duma convocations.

In 1993 he graduated from the Krasnotur'inskiy Industrial'nyy Kolledzh. Later he continued his education at the Ural State Technical University (2000) and the Russian Presidential Academy of National Economy and Public Administration (2011). Bidonko started his political career in 2009 when he was elected the head of Karpinsk (nominated by the United Russia). In 2013 he was re-elected for the same position. On December 15, 2014, Governor of Sverdlovsk Oblast appointed Bidonko Deputy Minister of Construction and Architecture of the region.

In 2016 he was elected deputy of the 7th State Duma convocation. On January 10, 2019, his deputy powers were terminated ahead of schedule as Bidonko was appointed vice-governor of Sverdlovsk Oblast.

Since 2021 he has served as deputy of the 8th State Duma.

He is one of the members of the State Duma the United States Treasury sanctioned on 24 March 2022 in response to the 2022 Russian invasion of Ukraine.

References

1975 births
Living people
United Russia politicians
21st-century Russian politicians
Eighth convocation members of the State Duma (Russian Federation)
Russian individuals subject to the U.S. Department of the Treasury sanctions